Princess (42WD593) was a pigeon who received the Dickin Medal in 1946 from the People's Dispensary for Sick Animals for bravery in service during the Second World War. Princess was cited after returning from a special mission to Crete to her loft at RAF Alexandria, a distance of around 500 miles primarily over sea, carrying valuable information. The citation describes the flight as one of the finest performances in the war record of the Pigeon Service.

See also
 List of individual birds

References

External links
 PDSA Dickin Medal

Recipients of the Dickin Medal
Individual domesticated pigeons